The Ecuador composting method is a common composting practice in the lowlands of Ecuador and Peru. The compost pile is embedded on the tree trunk or banana stalks, with a pale erected in the middle. Organic matter is placed in layers on the trunks or stalks, each layer being covered by mud, or inlaid via different types of organic matter. When the pile is about 1.2 meters high, it is watered and covered by big leaves. After some time, when the compost pile settles down, the central pale is removed for aeration. This composting method is typically done in a small-scale, by indigenous villagers.

Composting